"Where's Your Head At" is a song by British electronic music duo Basement Jaxx. It was released as the third single from their second album, Rooty, on 19 November 2001. The song is based on samples from Gary Numan's songs "M.E." and "This Wreckage". The song peaked at number nine in Canada and the United Kingdom, number 16 in Australia, and number 39 on the US Billboard Modern Rock Tracks chart, the band's only charting single on a non-dance music chart in the United States. The song ranked at number 83 on Pitchfork Medias list of the "Top 500 Tracks of the 2000s".

Music video
The music video, directed by Traktor, starts with a man (played by Damien Samuels) entering an undisclosed location ("the armpit of nowhere" as he calls it) to meet up with a man who claims to have "the latest thing in pop music". Meanwhile, an unconscious guitarist is shown being wheeled away on a hospital gurney, with the song starting when he lifts his head.

The man then meets up with a scientist (played by Czech actor Petr Janiš), who then shows him his idea – monkeys playing music – with the help of several props. The protagonist seems unconvinced by the presentation. The laboratory secretary then suggests that the scientist should demonstrate the idea instead. He is then led into another room and sat behind a protective screen, with a view of a chamber containing instruments and DJing equipment. Three monkeys are brought into the chamber and start to play the instruments – it is revealed that their faces are those of humans (two of the monkeys have the faces of band members Felix Buxton and Simon Ratcliffe). After playing for a while, another monkey appears and all the monkeys suddenly start destroying the equipment, a behaviour which inexplicably carries over into the scientist observing the performance. The group of monkeys then surround the main character, who promptly flees.

During his escape, the protagonist stumbles upon a room containing a monkey and an unconscious human both hooked up to a machine. The monkey's face then becomes more human in appearance. The protagonist, now horrified, sees a diagram on the wall showcasing pictures of a human brain pointing towards several monkey brains. It turns out the "latest thing in pop music" is an experiment where musicians' brains are being transferred to monkeys, and he is planned to be the next victim. The video ends with him escaping down a laundry chute to a room with men who have monkey-like faces, only to be cornered by the scientist and a dog, who also has the face of the scientist.

The video won two awards at the 11th Annual Music Video Production Awards for Best Electronica Video and Best Directorial Debut. Pitchfork ranked the video at number 24 in their list of The Top 50 Music Videos of the 2000s.

Remixes
In 2011, DJ Chuckie created a mashup of the song with Cold Blank's remix of "Cal State Anthem" and played it at the Electric Daisy Carnival in Las Vegas, as well as several other festivals and events around the world.

In 2021, Drum and bass producer and DJ 1991 released a remix of the song.

Track listing
 "Where's Your Head At"
 "Where's Your Head At" (Stanton Warriors Mix)
 "Romeo" (Acoustic Mix)

Charts

Weekly charts

Year-end charts

Certifications and sales

Release history

Cover versions
US noise rock band Melkbelly released a cover version of the song in 2018.

References

2001 singles
2001 songs
Astralwerks singles
Basement Jaxx songs
Songs written by Felix Buxton
Songs written by Gary Numan
Songs written by Simon Ratcliffe (musician)
XL Recordings singles